PDF Studio is a commercial desktop application from Qoppa Software to create, convert, review, annotate, and edit Portable Document Format (PDF) documents.

System requirements 
PDF Studio runs on Windows, Mac, Linux, Unix
 Windows: Windows 11, Windows 10, Windows Blue 8.1, Windows 8, Windows 7, Windows Vista, Windows XP SP3, Windows Server 2012, 2008, 2003
 Mac: macOS 11.1 (Big Sur), macOS 10.15 (Catalina), macOS 10.14 (Mojave), macOS 10.13 High Sierra, macOS 10.12 Sierra, Mac OS X 10.10 Yosemite, Mac OS X 10.9 Mavericks, Mac OS X 10.8 Mountain Lion
 Linux: Most Linux distributions including Debian, Fedora, Manjaro, Mint, Red Hat, Suse, Ubuntu
 Unix: Most Unix flavors including Raspbian (Raspberry Pi), AIX, Solaris Intel, Solaris Sparc, HP-UX
Processor: 2.5 GHz or faster processor
RAM: 1024 MB system memory
Display: 1024x768 screen resolution
Hard Disk Space: 300 MB of available hard disk space

See also
 List of PDF software

References

External links
 Qoppa Software Home Page

Desktop publishing software
PDF software
Java (programming language) software